Grupo Desportivo de Maputo, usually known as Desportivo de Maputo, Desportivo Maputo or by the acronym GDM, is an association football club from Maputo, Mozambique.

History
The club was founded on May 31, 1921, as Grupo Desportivo de Lourenço Marques by Professor Sá Couto, José Maria Rodrigues, Alfredo Fragoso, Américo Costa, Martinho Carvalho Durão and Professor Cabanelas. In 1976, after Mozambique's independence from Portugal, the club was renamed to Grupo Desportivo de Maputo. The club's logo was also changed.

1925 Desportivo won the District Championship of Lourenço Marques, a competition held between 1922 and 1961. A further eleven wins followed. In 1957 Desportivo achieved its first of altogether eight Mozambican championships 1956, which was held first in 1956. The club won its last national championship in 2006. In 2012 Desportivo was relegated for the first time.

Most famous of all players from Desportivo is Mário Coluna, who won with Benfica amongst others the European Champion's Cup of 1961 and 1962 and achieved with Portugal the third place in the 1966 World Cup.

Stadium
The club plays their home matches at Estádio Nacional do Zimpeto, which has a maximum capacity of 42,000 people.

Club colors
The club colors are black and white.

Achievements

Football
 Championship of Mozambique:
 colonial era (2): 1957, 1964.
 after independence (6): 1977, 1978, 1983, 1988, 1995, 2006.
 District Championship of Lourenço Marques: (12)
1925, 1926, 1927, 1929, 1937, 1944, 1945, 1946, 1952, 1956, 1957, 1959.

 Cup of Mozambique: (2)
1981, 2006.

 Honour Cup of Maputo: (2)
2007, 2008.

Roller Hockey
 Championship of Mozambique: (15)
1976, 1987, 1994, 1995, 1996, 1997, 1998, 1999, 2000, 2001, 2002, 2003, 2004, 2006, 2010.

 Championship of Portugal: (3)
1969, 1971, 1973.

Performance in African competitions
CAF Champions League: 1 appearance
2006–07: Last 32 - Lost against Mamelodi Sundowns (3–1 on aggregate)

CAF Cup Winners' Cup: 1 appearance
1989–90: Semi-finals - Lost against BCC Lions (7–3 on aggregate)

Current squad

Other sports
Besides football, Desportivo de Maputo also has other sports sections, such as athletics, basketball, five-a-side football, rink hockey, and swimming.

References
 Much of the content of this article comes from the equivalent Portuguese-language Wikipedia article (retrieved June 12, 2006).

External links
 Desportivo de Maputo's official website

Association football clubs established in 1921
Desportivo
Sport in Maputo
1921 establishments in Mozambique